Events in the year 2006 in Germany.

Incumbents

Federal level
President: Horst Köhler
Chancellor: Angela Merkel

State level
Minister-President of Baden-Württemberg: Günther Oettinger
Minister-President of Bavaria: Edmund Stoiber
Governing mayor of Berlin: Klaus Wowereit
First mayor of Bremen: Jens Böhrnsen
Minister-President of Brandenburg: Matthias Platzeck
First mayor of Hamburg: Ole von Beust
Minister-President of Hesse: Roland Koch
Minister-President of Lower Saxony: Christian Wulff
Minister-President of Mecklenburg-Vorpommern: Harald Ringstorff
Minister-President of North Rhine-Westphalia: Jürgen Rüttgers
Minister-President of Rhineland-Palatinate: Kurt Beck
Minister-President of the Saarland: Peter Müller
Minister-President of Saxony: Georg Milbradt
Minister-President of Saxony-Anhalt: Wolfgang Böhmer
Minister-President of Schleswig-Holstein: Peter Harry Carstensen
Minister-President of Thuringia: Dieter Althaus

Events
 2 January - Bad Reichenhall Ice Rink roof collapse
 9 February - Bundesvision Song Contest 2006
 9–19 February - 56th Berlin International Film Festival
 February - April - 2006 European floods
 9 March - Germany in the Eurovision Song Contest 2006
 26 May - Berlin Hauptbahnhof opened
 9 June - 2006 FIFA World Cup in Germany was opened.
 26 June - Murder of Frauke Liebs
 31 July - 2006 German train bombing plot
 22 September - Lathen train collision
 26 September - 2006 Idomeneo controversy at Deutsche Oper Berlin
 26 September – 1 October – photokina in Cologne
 20 November - Emsdetten school shooting
 October - 2006 German troops controversy

Sport

 2006 FIFA World Cup
 Germany at the 2006 Winter Olympics
 2005–06 Bundesliga
 2005–06 2. Bundesliga
 2005–06 DEL season
 2006 German Grand Prix
 2006 European Grand Prix
 2006 German motorcycle Grand Prix

Elections

 Baden-Württemberg state election
 Berlin state election
 Mecklenburg-Vorpommern state election
 Rhineland-Palatinate state election
 Saxony-Anhalt state election

Deaths
 27 January - Johannes Rau, politician (born 1931)
 3 February - Reinhart Koselleck, German historian (born 1923)
 30 April - Paul Spiegel, President of Central Council of Jews in Germany (born 1937)
 4 May - Fritz Schenk, broadcast journalist (born 1930)
 9 June - Drafi Deutscher, German singer (born 1946)
 10 June - Wulff-Dieter Heintz, German astronomer (born 1930)
 27 July - Elisabeth Volkmann, German actress (born 1936)
 2 August - Holger Börner, politician (born 1931)
 26 August - Rainer Barzel, politician (born 1924)
 26 August - Ulrich de Maizière, general (born 1912)
 7 September - Andreas Meyer-Hanno, German theater and opera director (born 1932)
 18 September -Heinrich Trettner, general (born 1907)
 1 October - Frank Beyer, German film director (born 1932)
 5 October - Friedrich Karl Flick, German industrialist and billionaire (born 1927)
 6 October - Heinz Sielmann, German zoologist, biologist and filmmaker (born 1917)
 20 October - Maxi Herber, German figure skater (born 1920)
 9 November -Ingrid Hartmann, German sprint canoer (born 1930)
 10 May- Robert Alvarez Lee ii, WW ii Veteran (born 1926)

See also
2006 in German television

References

 
Years of the 21st century in Germany
Germany